Acrobasis angusella, the hickory leafstem borer or leafstem borer, is a species of snout moth in the genus Acrobasis. It was described by Augustus Radcliffe Grote in 1880, and is known from Quebec, Canada, and northeastern United States.

The wingspan is about 18 mm. Adults are on wing from May to September.

The larvae feed on Carya species, including Carya glabra, Carya ovalis and Carya tomentosa. They bore in the leaf stems of their host plant, causing the leaves to fall off.

References

Moths described in 1880
Acrobasis
Moths of North America